The 2006 Formula BMW World Final was the second Formula BMW World Final race and held for the first time at Circuit Ricardo Tormo in Cheste near Valencia on 24–26 November 2006. The race was won by Josef Kaufmann Racing's driver Christian Vietoris, who finished ahead Mika Mäki and Stefano Coletti.

Drivers and teams

Qualifying

Group 1

Group 2

Super Pole Competition

Heats

Heat 1 (A vs B)

Heat 2 (C vs D)

Heat 3 (A vs C)

Heat 4 (B vs D)

Heat 5 (A vs D)

Heat 6 (B vs C)

Summary

Final Race

References

Formula BMW seasons
BMW World Final
BMW World Final